Deml is a German surname. Notable people with the surname include:

 Jakub Deml (1878–1961), Czech Catholic priest and writer
 Marianne Deml (born 1949), German politician
 Max Deml (born 1957), German-Austrian writer
 Nicholas J. Deml (born 1987), American attorney and government official
 Wolfgang Deml (born 1945), German entrepreneur

German-language surnames